Two-way indicator species analysis (TWINSPAN) is a Fortran-based statistical analysis method described in 1979 by Hill. It is widely used in ecological research.

As of 1997, it was the only widespread standardized method to identify indicator plants.

References

Ecological data